Manoidea is a superfamily of pangolins from suborder Eupholidota that includes extant family Manidae, extinct family Patriomanidae and extinct genus Necromanis.

Taxonomy 
 Superfamily: Manoidea
 Family: Manidae (pangolins)
 Family: †Patriomanidae
 Incertae sedis
 Genus: †Necromanis

Phylogeny 
Phylogenetic position of superfamily Manoidea within suborder Eupholidota.

References 

Pangolins
Mammal superfamilies